Alceu Elias Feldmann Filho (born September 4, 1972) is a Brazilian racing driver. Feldmann has 13 seasons in Stock Car Brasil.

Suspension
On July 4, 2012, it was announced that Alceu Feldmann was to be suspended from racing for 24 months, due to refusal to take the anti-doping examination in fifth round at Velopark. Feldmann is appealing the decision and was released to race at Rio de Janeiro. On 15 August 2012, was decided maintenance will 24 months suspension.

References

External links
 

1973 births
Living people
Racing drivers from São Paulo
Brazilian racing drivers
Stock Car Brasil drivers

Brazilian people of German descent